A disjunctive sequence is an infinite sequence (over a finite alphabet of characters) in which every finite string appears as a substring. For instance, the binary Champernowne sequence

formed by concatenating all binary strings in shortlex order, clearly contains all the binary strings and so is disjunctive. (The spaces above are not significant and are present solely to make clear the boundaries between strings).  The complexity function of a disjunctive sequence S over an alphabet of size k is pS(n) = kn.

Any normal sequence (a sequence in which each string of equal length appears with equal frequency) is disjunctive, but the converse is not true. For example, letting 0n denote the string of length n consisting of all 0s, consider the sequence

obtained by splicing exponentially long strings of 0s into the shortlex ordering of all binary strings. Most of this sequence consists of long runs of 0s, and so it is not normal, but it is still disjunctive.

A disjunctive sequence is recurrent but never uniformly recurrent/almost periodic.

Examples

The following result can be used to generate a variety of disjunctive sequences:

If a1, a2, a3, ..., is a strictly increasing infinite sequence of positive integers such that  n → ∞ (an+1 / an) = 1,
then for any positive integer m and any integer base b ≥ 2, there is an an whose expression in base b starts with the expression of m in base b. 
(Consequently, the infinite sequence obtained by concatenating the base-b expressions for a1, a2, a3, ..., is disjunctive over the alphabet {0, 1, ..., b-1}.)

Two simple cases illustrate this result:
 an = nk, where k is a fixed positive integer. (In this case,  n → ∞ (an+1 / an) =  n → ∞ ( (n+1)k / nk ) =  n → ∞ (1 + 1/n)k = 1.)
 E.g., using base-ten expressions, the sequences 
 123456789101112... (k = 1, positive natural numbers), 
 1491625364964... (k = 2, squares),
 182764125216343... (k = 3, cubes), 
 etc., 
are disjunctive on {0,1,2,3,4,5,6,7,8,9}.
 an = pn, where pn is the nth prime number. (In this case,  n → ∞ (an+1 / an) = 1 is a consequence of pn ~ n ln n.)
 E.g., the sequences 
 23571113171923... (using base ten), 
 10111011111011110110001 ... (using base two), 
 etc., 
are disjunctive on the respective digit sets.

Another result that provides a variety of disjunctive sequences is as follows:
If an = (f(n)), where f is any non-constant polynomial with real coefficients such that f(x) > 0 for all x > 0,
then the concatenation a1a2a3... (with the an expressed in base b) is a normal sequence in base b, and is therefore disjunctive on {0, 1, ..., b-1}. 

E.g., using base-ten expressions, the sequences
 818429218031851879211521610... (with f(x) = 2x3 - 5x2 + 11x )
 591215182124273034... (with f(x) = πx + e)
are disjunctive on {0,1,2,3,4,5,6,7,8,9}.

Rich numbers
A rich number or disjunctive number is a real number whose expansion with respect to some base b is a disjunctive sequence over the alphabet {0,...,b−1}.  Every normal number in base b is disjunctive but not conversely.  The real number x is rich in base b if and only if the set { x bn mod 1} is dense in the unit interval.

 A number that is disjunctive to every base is called absolutely disjunctive or is said to be a lexicon. Every string in every alphabet occurs within a lexicon.  A set is called "comeager" or "residual" if it contains the intersection of a countable family of open dense sets. The set of absolutely disjunctive reals is residual.  It is conjectured that every real irrational algebraic number is absolutely disjunctive.

Notes

References

Sequences and series